The white-browed antbird (Myrmoborus leucophrys) is a species of perching bird in the family Thamnophilidae. It is found in Bolivia, Brazil, Colombia, Ecuador, French Guiana, Guyana, Peru, Suriname, and Venezuela. Its natural habitats are subtropical or tropical moist lowland forests and subtropical or tropical moist montane forests.

References

white-browed antbird
Birds of the Amazon Basin
Birds of the Guianas
white-browed antbird
Taxonomy articles created by Polbot